is a former Japanese football player.

Playing career
Shimada was born in Ogose, Saitama on January 19, 1982. After graduating from high school, he joined J2 League club Omiya Ardija based in his local in 2000. On November 18, 2001, he debuted as substitute midfielder from the 60th minute against Ventforet Kofu. However he could hardly play in the match until 2002. From 2003, he played many matches as substitute midfielder and the club was promoted to J1 League from 2005. In 2006, he moved to J2 club Thespa Kusatsu on loan. He became a regular player as offensive midfielder. In 2007, he returned to Omiya Ardija. However he could hardly play in the match behind Chikara Fujimoto and Daigo Kobayashi. In 2008, he moved to Thespa Kusatsu again. He played in all 42 matches as regular player. In 2009, he moved to J2 club Sagan Tosu. He played in all 50 matches except 1 match for suspension. In 2010, he moved to J2 club Tokushima Vortis and played many matches in 2 seasons. In 2012, he moved to South Korea and joined Gangwon FC. He retired end of 2012 season.

Club statistics

References

External links 

 

1982 births
Living people
Association football people from Saitama Prefecture
Japanese footballers
J1 League players
J2 League players
K League 1 players
Omiya Ardija players
Thespakusatsu Gunma players
Sagan Tosu players
Tokushima Vortis players
Gangwon FC players
Japanese expatriate footballers
Japanese expatriate sportspeople in South Korea
Expatriate footballers in South Korea
Association football midfielders